Colvin Reginald de Silva (1907 – 27 February 1989; commonly known as Colvin R. de Silva) was a Cabinet Minister of Plantation Industries and Constitutional Affairs, prominent member of parliament, Trotskyist leader and lawyer in Sri Lanka. He was one of the founders of the Lanka Sama Samaja Party – the first Marxist party in Sri Lanka.

Early life and education
Colvin R. de Silva was born in Balapitiya. His father Dr Obinamuni Arnolis De Silva, was a registered medical practitioner attached to the Department of Health. His mother Pettagan Joseline De Silva was a daughter of a business tycoon Pettagan Aseneris De Silva, His elder brother was Walwin de Silva, a civil servant.

He received his education at St. John's College, Panadura and at the Royal College, Colombo where he won colours. He thereafter studied history at University College, Ceylon, gaining a BA from the University of London and went on to gain his PhD from King's College London in 1932 for his thesis: Ceylon Under the British Occupation, later published as a book.

Legal career
On his return to Ceylon, Dr Colvin R. de Silva took oaths as an advocate of the Supreme Court of Ceylon and started his practice as a lawyer. He gain fame in the writ of Habeas Corpus related to Mark Anthony Bracegirdle, where he appeared for Bracegirdle as junior of H.V. Perera. From the 1940s to the 1960s Dr Colvin R. de Silva enjoyed an unparalleled reputation as a criminal lawyer of great distinction. He appeared in virtually every high-profile criminal trial of his day. In the Sathasivam murder case, his exceptionally brilliant cross-examining skills resulted in the acquittal of his client, while in the Kularatne murder case appeal, it was his intimate knowledge of the law of circumstantial evidence that saved the accused. With the advent of Fundamental Rights litigation, Dr. de Silva also appeared in many such cases before the Supreme Court, most notably in the Vivienne Goonewardena assault case. He continued his legal practice until his death, with the exception of when he was serving as a minister.

Political career

Early politics
Dr. Colvin R. de Silva became the first president of the Lanka Sama Samaja Party when it was established on 21 December 1935 at Lorenz College Hall, along with Dr. N.M. Perera, Leslie Goonewardene, Philip Gunawardena and Robert Gunawardena. 

An active Trotskyite, during the Second World War he fled to India, after escaping from Bogambara Prison, where he had been imprisoned on charges of sedition for anti-war activities. In India he became part of the leading nucleus of the Bolshevik-Leninist Party of India, Ceylon and Burma (BLPI). After the war he returned to Ceylon and became the main leader of the Bolshevik Samasamaja Party.

Parliament
In 1947 he was one of five BSP candidates who were elected to parliament. His constituency was Wellawatte-Galkissa. After the reunification of LSSP and BSP, de Silva became an important leader of LSSP.

In 1952 he lost the Wellawatte-Galkissa seat to the United National Party candidate, S. de Silva Jayasinghe due to the unpopularity he gain for his role in the Sathasivam murder case, but regained it at the subsequent parliamentary elections in 1956. During the passing of the Sinhala Only Act, he spoke his famous last words: "Do we... want a single nation or do we want two nations? Do we want a single state or do we want two? Do we want one Ceylon or do we want two? And above all, do we want an independent Ceylon which must necessarily be united and single and single Ceylon, or two bleeding halves of Ceylon which can be gobbled up by every ravaging imperialist monster that may happen to range the Indian ocean? These are issues that in fact we have been discussing under the form and appearance of language issue." His predictions came true a few years later with the formation of LTTE and subsequent civil war between the LTTE separatist movement and the Sri Lankan government.

De Silva was responsible on behalf of LSSP for the liaisons with the Fourth International. He was elected to the International Executive Committee of the International, a position he held until the LSSP was expelled from the International.

In 1964 de Silva had urged against the LSSP joining the government, but unlike others who stood by that line he stayed in the party.

He won the Agalawatte parliamentary seat in a by-election in 1967 and in 1970. In 1970 he became the Minister of Plantation Industries and Constitutional Affairs in the cabinet of Sirimavo Bandaranaike. His tasks included drafting the new republican constitution of Sri Lanka, which is seen by Kumari Jayawardena as the first constitutional enshrinement of Sinhala chauvinism which had previously been limited to statute law. He served until 1975, when his party was dismissed from government following a split. He lost his seat at the 1977 parliament elections along with all the leftists who contested.

Party leader
After death of Dr. N. M. Perera the LSSP leader, Colvin de Silva became the leader and the party nominated de Silva as its presidential candidate in 1982. He finished 5th and only polled around 1% of the votes cast, as the election was polarised between the ruling United National Party and the Sri Lanka Freedom Party – the latter being backed by almost all the other left parties.
In 1987 he led a protests against the ban on May Day rallies in Sri Lanka and suffered a serious burn injury to one of his feet due to a tear gas cartridge that was thrown at the protesters by the police, which troubled him till his death. In 1988 his party came to an alliance with three other leftist parties to form United Socialist Alliance (USA) from which he was nominated as a national list member of parliament (MP).

Death
He died a few days prior to taking his oath as an MP under new alliance on 27 February 1989 in Colombo. Union Place, Colombo was named after him.

Family
Colvin R. de Silva married Pettagan Suvineetha De Silva from his home town of Balapitiya. She was the daughter of Pettagan Benial De Silva, a businessman. They had two daughters and one son. All their children took to law with both daughters becoming barristers. Their eldest Manouri Muttetuwegama was a former Commissioner of the Human Rights Commission of Sri Lanka and was married to Sarath Muttetuwegama, Communist Party member of Parliament. Their youngest was Nalina and their only son was Nalina Visvajith. The family lived down Abdul Gafoor Mawatha in Colpetty. He was a cousin of Charles Percival de Silva.

Publications
De Silva, Colvin R., Ceylon Under the British Occupation, 1795–1833  First published 1941. Reprint: Delhi, Vedam Books, 1995
De Silva, Colvin R., An Outline of the Permanent Revolution

References

External links
 Dr. Colvin R De Silva in Sinhala
Official Website of Lanka Sama Samaja Party (LSSP)
Dr. Colvin R. de Silva: undying legend
Hartal!, article by de Silva from 1953
New York Times Obituary
 Amara Samara in Sinhala

1907 births
1987 deaths
20th-century Sri Lankan lawyers
Alumni of King's College London
Alumni of Royal College, Colombo
Alumni of St. John's College, Panadura
Alumni of the Ceylon University College
Candidates in the 1982 Sri Lankan presidential election
Ceylonese advocates
Escapees from British Ceylon detention
Fugitives wanted by Sri Lanka
Government ministers of Sri Lanka
Indian independence activists
Lanka Sama Samaja Party politicians
Members of Lincoln's Inn
Members of the 1st Parliament of Ceylon
Members of the 3rd Parliament of Ceylon
Members of the 7th Parliament of Ceylon
People from British Ceylon
Prisoners and detainees of British Ceylon
Sinhalese academics
Sinhalese lawyers
Sinhalese politicians
Sri Lankan barristers
Sri Lankan independence activists
Sri Lankan politicians convicted of crimes
Sri Lankan prisoners and detainees
Sri Lankan trade unionists